We'll Meet Again with Ann Curry is an American documentary television series hosted by Ann Curry that premiered on January 23, 2018, on PBS. The series follows individuals who survived tragic events and are reunited with the long-lost people with whom they experienced that important moment.

The series is executive produced by Curry, Andra Heritage, and Justine Kershaw. The show marks Curry's first major project since leaving NBC News after 25 years.

The first season features people who experienced World War II, the 1980 eruption of Mount St. Helens, the Vietnam War, the September 11 terrorist attacks,  the Civil Rights Movement of the 1960s, and the early days of the LGBT Movement of the 1970s.

Premise
Each episode of We'll Meet Again introduces "two people who were affected by momentous events in American history. We follow them on a journey of detection as they look for a long-lost friend, family member or significant stranger. The series explores significant historic events that have shaped America and its citizens - not from the point of view of world leaders - but through the eyes of ordinary people who experienced them directly."

Production
The series was conceived by British producer Justine Kershaw. She was inspired by her own reunion story which involves a Greek goat-herder who rescued her after a fall. After developing her initial concept, she set about finding a newsperson to serve as the presenter of the series. She describes deciding upon Curry by “literally, just Googling .... Every piece I saw just convinced me that this was the person.”

On July 26, 2017, it was announced that PBS had given the production a series order with first season consisting of six episodes. The series was set to be executive produced by Ann Curry, Justine Kershaw, and Andra Heritage and produced by Simon Harries. Production companies involved with the series were slated to consist of Blink Films and Ann Curry Inc. On October 29, 2018, it was reported that the series would return for a second season that was scheduled to premiere on November 13, 2018.

Episodes

Season 1 (2018)

Season 2 (2018–19)

Reception
The series has received a positive reception since its premiere. Verne Gay of Newsday gave the show three out of four stars and commented that "Curry’s trademark style is on display here but it’s not on over-display. She wisely stands aside for the most part and lets her subjects tell their stories. She does what she does best, which is to draw those out."

References

External links

PBS original programming
2018 American television series debuts
Historical television series
Television series about family history
2010s American documentary television series
English-language television shows